Ellis Ross is a Canadian politician who was first elected in the 2017 British Columbia general election to represent Skeena. He was re-elected in 2020 and is currently serving his fifth year as a Member of the Legislative Assembly of British Columbia. He is a member of the British Columbia Liberal Party caucus and serves as its Critic for Energy & LNG.

Career 
Prior to his election to the legislature, Ross was the Chief Councillor for the Haisla Nation. In 2006, he signed a $50 million agreement with Kitimat LNG to build a liquid natural gas plant on one of the Haisla Nation reserves. Ross also did survey work for the Department of Fisheries and Oceans, then went into business with his brother doing hand logging and salvage log beachcombing. He also ran a charter boat. He was inducted into the Order of British Columbia in 2014.

In 2017 Ross was elected to the BC Legislature for the riding of Skeena. The riding had previously been an NDP-stronghold, with the NDP winning the riding in five of the previous six elections - the only exception being the historic 2001 BC Liberal landslide. Upon his election Ross appointed to cabinet by Premier Christy Clark, where he served as the Minister of Natural Gas Development and Minister Responsible for Housing until the NDP and Greens defeated the government on a confidence vote.

Ross was re-elected an MLA in 2020. In 2021, he became a candidate for the leadership of the BC Liberal Party.

Electoral record

References

21st-century Canadian politicians
21st-century First Nations people
British Columbia Liberal Party MLAs
First Nations politicians
Haisla people
Indigenous leaders in British Columbia
Living people
Members of the Executive Council of British Columbia
Members of the Order of British Columbia
People from the Regional District of Kitimat–Stikine
Year of birth missing (living people)